Necessary Roughness is a 1991 American sport comedy film directed by Stan Dragoti, his final film. The film stars Scott Bakula, Héctor Elizondo, Robert Loggia, and Harley Jane Kozak. Co-stars include Larry Miller, Sinbad, Jason Bateman, Kathy Ireland, Rob Schneider, and Fred Dalton Thompson.

The film touches on an up-and-coming season at the fictional higher learning institution of Texas State University and its football team nicknamed the Fightin' Armadillos. (At the time the film was made, there was no Texas State University, but in 2003, Southwest Texas State University changed its name to Texas State University, nicknamed the Bobcats, which coincidentally was the "season opener" opponent of the fictional Texas State Armadillos.)

The once-powerful Armadillos are forced to start the season with a host of new coaches and players after the previous staff and all but one players are banned following a scandal. This predicament is based on the "death penalty" handed out to the Southern Methodist University football team for violations very similar to the ones found at the fictional Texas State.

Plot
The Texas State University Fightin' Armadillos were once one of the most powerful teams in college football. After winning consecutive conference and national championships, massive NCAA violations resulted in the program having to forfeit years' worth of victories. All of the coaches were fired and all of the players are banned from returning and expelled from college except Charlie Banks, the only "clean" player, who never got to play despite having "heart".

This move forces new head coach Ed "Straight Arrow" Gennero (Elizondo) to build an almost entirely new team with little assistance. No athletic scholarships are available, forcing them to hold tryouts. Along with this, they must worry about Phillip Elias (Miller), the dean of the university, who wants the team to fail so he can scrap it due to the corruption the football program has caused over the years, and funnel the funding into his own pocket. The coaches soon have a makeshift team in place.

Due to Dean Elias declaring many prospective players ineligible because of poor grades, only 17 players are allowed on the team—not enough for separate offensive and defensive squads. The Armadillos are thus forced to play ironman football. The team lacks experience and talent in all areas, especially at quarterback, placekicker, and the defensive line. Assistant coach Wally "Rig" Riggendorf (Loggia) finds Paul Blake (Bakula), a 34-year-old high school star who never attended college due to his father's death. Rig convinces him to enroll and become the Armadillos' quarterback.

Blake arrives on campus and catches everyone's attention due to his age, especially Professor Carter (Kozak). Blake then recruits a graduate student teaching assistant named Andre Krimm (Sinbad), who is also enrolled at the school and still has some eligibility remaining. Blake convinces him to join, and he is positioned on the defensive line, where he excelled years earlier. Even with the new members, the team is unable to win.

Carter tells Blake that she knows him from 16 years earlier. Carter's ex-boyfriend was a high school football star, but Blake and his team humiliated him and his team in a 1975 championship game. This episode actually caused Carter to become infatuated with Blake. Now, years after the fact, the two begin a romantic relationship which Dean Elias opposes due to their student-teacher dynamic—not to mention Elias' own lascivious interest in Carter.

Coach Rig makes one more recruiting move to secure a kicker. He shocks everybody by selecting Lucy Draper (Ireland) from the school's women's soccer team.  When she is brought on board, the team has its first taste of success, as Draper kicks a field goal in a driving rainstorm to forge a 3–3 tie with Kansas (in real life, Kansas holds the all-time NCAA Division I-A record for number of tie games with 57). After this game, Blake quits the team after arguments with Gennero and Carter, but convinces himself to come back after a teammate Edison, who is also quitting, inadvertently changes his mind and both come back. Dean Elias barges into Carter's office after end-of-term exams, first coming onto her as a distraction from him tampering with the team's grades (to sabotage their eligibility for the final game), but she plays along momentarily before warning him that if one grade changes, she'll report him to the University President.

With the coaches and players now on the same page, the team plays their last game of the season against the number one ranked team in the state of Texas, the University of Texas Colts, with whom the Armadillos were involved in a barroom brawl earlier in the season. They head into the game as huge underdogs, and without Gennero, who is hospitalized just before the game for a potential heart attack, leaving Coach Rig in charge. After a horrible first half, they rally in the second half to cut the deficit to one, and Gennero returns to the sideline, having only suffered from 
indigestion, though he lets Coach Rig call the final play. Minutes before the final touchdown, after learning about his scheme to get rid of the football program (and his sexual harassment of Carter), TSU president Purcell fires Dean Elias, though not before the entire Armadillo defensive line runs him down. The team decides to try to win it all with a two-point conversion. They fake a point after attempt and pass for two. Blake scrambles and finally finds Banks in the end zone to win the game.

Cast

Team
 Scott Bakula as Paul Blake
 Héctor Elizondo as Coach Ed Gennero
 Robert Loggia as Coach Wally Riggendorf
 Sinbad as Andre Krimm
 Jason Bateman as Jarvis Edison
 Andrew Bryniarski as Wyatt Beaudry
 Duane Davis as Featherstone
 Michael Dolan as Eric 'Samurai' Hansen
 Marcus Giamatti as Sargie 'Fumblina' Wilkinson
 Kathy Ireland as Lucy Draper
 Andrew Lauer as Charlie Banks
 Louis Mandylor as McKenzie
 Peter Tuiasosopo as Laikai "the Slender" Manumana

Other
 Harley Jane Kozak as Dr. Suzanne Carter
 Larry Miller as Dean Phillip Elias
 Fred Thompson as University President Carver Purcell
 Rob Schneider as Chuck Neiderman
 Garrett Schenck as Grant Edison
 Rodger Boyce as Sheriff Woods
 Chris Berman as himself

Production
The film was shot at various locations in Texas. Azle, Dallas, Fort Worth, and Denton were the primary locations used for filming. The University of North Texas in Denton, specifically Fouts Field, which was then UNT's football stadium, was a major location for filming football and college scenes. Texas State's green and white uniforms in the movie are exactly the same colors worn by North Texas. Texas State's helmet logo, a large "T" flanked by a smaller "s" and "u", is a nod to the Texas Southern University Tigers, whose helmet logo is a large "T" flanked by a smaller "s" and "u".

During one scene, when the team takes part in a scrimmage game with a team of convicts, cameos are made by several NFL players. These players included Jerry Rice, Roger Craig, Earl Campbell, Dick Butkus, Ben Davidson, Tony Dorsett, Ed 'Too Tall' Jones, Herschel Walker, Jim Kelly, and Randy White. The film also has some cameo appearances from Chris Berman and Evander Holyfield.

Reception
The film was released on September 27, 1991, and went on to gross over $26 million at the box office. The film earned an approval rating of 33% on Rotten Tomatoes based on 30 reviews. The consensus states: "This likable, goofy football comedy has its moments, but it ultimately adheres too closely to the sports movie playbook to overcome the cliches in the script." The film was released in the United Kingdom on March 27, 1992, and failed to reach the Top 10.

The Los Angeles Times called it "a genial, slight, entirely predictable football comedy". Roger Ebert wrote a more positive review, giving the film three out of four stars. Ebert stated that the film is predictable but does not pretend to be anything more than entertainment.

Legacy
In an unusual coincidence, Southwest Texas State University, the real team that is the fictional Texas State's first opponent in the film, was renamed Texas State University several years after the film was released. Prior to the renaming a "Texas State University" did not exist. The real Texas State's Bobcats (as opposed to the fictional Fighting Armadillos) now compete at the FBS (Div 1) level, the same level as the fictional Texas State.

References

External links
 
 
 

1991 films
1990s sports comedy films
American football films
American sports comedy films
Films directed by Stan Dragoti
Films produced by Mace Neufeld
Films scored by Bill Conti
Films set in Texas
Films shot in Texas
Paramount Pictures films
1991 comedy films
1990s English-language films
1990s American films